Anna Sew Hoy (b. 1976, Auckland, New Zealand) is an American sculptor based in Los Angeles, California. She works primarily in clay, a medium she has been drawn to since high school. Sew Hoy’s works are abstract and blend found everyday items with uniquely crafted ceramic pieces to evoke a familiar yet uncanny response. Noting the performative aspect of working with clay, Sew Hoy has often engaged other artists to activate her sculptural installations through performance. Art critic Christopher Miles has called the artist’s work “utterly contemporary… in both its go-lightly cannibalism with regard to boomer-era agendas and preoccupations—from Funk art and folk craft to essentialist symbolism—and its openness to the cultural forms and detritus of its moment (arguably not unlike Robert Rauschenberg’s openness to that of his) as legitimate grist for serious artmaking.”

Solo presentations of Sew Hoy’s work have been mounted at the MOCA Storefront, Los Angeles; Koenig & Clinton, New York; Aspen Art Museum, Colorado; San Jose Museum of Art; and Sikkema Jenkins & Company, New York. She is a recipient of the 2021 Anonymous Was a Woman Award and in 2018, she was the inaugural Martha Longenecker Roth Distinguished Artist in Residence at the Department of Visual Arts, University of California, San Diego. Sew Hoy’s largest public sculpture to date, Psychic Body Grotto, opened at Los Angeles State Historic Park in Spring 2017, commissioned by Los Angeles Nomadic Division (LAND) and supported by a 2015 Creative Capital Award for Visual Arts. Her work is in the collections of the Hammer Museum at UCLA, San Francisco Museum of Modern Art (SFMOMA), Los Angeles County Museum of Art (LACMA), and Museum of Contemporary Art San Diego (MCASD).

Life and work 
Anna Sew Hoy completed her BFA at the School of Visual Arts in New York City in 1998. While there, she worked as an archivist for artist Jackie Winsor, whose work had a lasting influence on her practice. Sew Hoy finished her MFA at Bard College in 2008.

Sew Hoy is also a passionate teacher and has taught sculpture and ceramics extensively throughout Southern California, taking adjunct positions at the University of California, Irvine (UCI), University of Southern California (USC), California Institute of the Arts (CalArts), and California State University, Long Beach (CSULB), among other institutions. In 2019, she was hired full-time at the University of California, Los Angeles (UCLA), where she is now Associate Professor and Ceramics Area Head in the Department of Art. In 2022, Sew Hoy was awarded a Guggenheim Fellowship.

Exhibitions 
Solo shows:
 2019: The Wettest Letter, Various Small Fires, Los Angeles, CA 
 2017: Anna Sew Hoy: Psychic Grotto Storefront, Museum of Contemporary Art, Los Angeles (MOCA), organized by Artist Curated Projects 
 2016: Invisible Tattoo, Koenig & Clinton Gallery, New York, NY 
 2015: “Magnetic Between,” Aspen Art Museum, Aspen, CO
 2013: "Planets Making Planets," Performance with Math Bass and Claire Kohne, Commissioned by LAND Nomadic Nights, Los Angeles
 2011: "Nothing All Day: Anna Sew Hoy,” San Jose Museum of Art, CA
 2008: "POW!," LAXART, Los Angeles, CA
Group shows:
 2022: The Hearing Trumpet, part I, organized by Danielle Shang, Galerie Marguo, Paris (catalog)
 2021: Abstracted Vocabularies, Museum of Contemporary Art San Diego
 2018: All Hands On Deck, curated by Kate McNamara, Ben Maltz Gallery at Otis College of Art and Design, Los Angeles
 2018: NOMAD: Anna Sew Hoy, Amy Yao and Jennie Jieun Lee, Artist Curated Projects, LA
 2017: From Funk to Punk: Left Coast Ceramics, curated by Peter Held, Everson Art Museum, Syracuse, NY
 2017: Hecate, curated by Sara Hantman, Various Small Fires, Los Angeles
 2016 L.A. Exuberance: New Gifts by Artists, Los Angeles County Museum of Art
 2015: “Surface of Color,” The Pit, Los Angeles, CA
 2014: “Made In LA,” Hammer Museum, Los Angeles Museum of Art's Installation
 2013: "Prospect 2013," Museum of Contemporary Art San Diego
 2013: "And How Are We Feeling Today?" University Art Gallery, UCSD, San Diego
 2011: "The More Things Change," San Francisco Museum of Modern Art, CA
 2009: "Electric Mud," curated by David Pagel, Blaffer Art Museum, Houston, TX
 2008: "California Biennial 2008," Orange County Museum of Art, CA
 2008: "Sew Hoy, Lutker, Youngblood," University Art Museum, University of California, Santa Barbara
 2008: "Now You See It," Aspen Art Museum, Aspen, Colorado
 2007: "Edens Edge: Fifteen LA Artists,” Hammer Museum, Los Angeles, CA
 2006: "Cosmic Wonder," Yerba Buena Center for the Arts, San Francisco
 2005: "Diamond Hand Grenade," Midway Contemporary Art, Minneapolis

Publications 
Anna Sew Hoy: Suppose and a Pair of Jeans, Published by RAM Distribution, May 2013,

External Links 
 Anna Sew Hoy artist website

References 

1976 births
American women sculptors
People from Auckland
Living people
21st-century American women artists